Bland Creek Bridge is a cast iron road bridge that carries the Newell Highway across Bland Creek in , Bland Shire, New South Wales, Australia. It was constructed in the late 1990s, following the Roads & Traffic Authority's massive 1990s construction roll-out of a central New South Wales bridge project.

Road bridges in New South Wales
Bland Shire
Newell Highway